The 2016 British GT Championship was the 24th British GT Championship. The season began on 17 April at Brands Hatch and finished on 11 September at Donington Park, after nine rounds held over seven meetings. After using Avon Tyres since 2006, the championship switched to Pirelli tyres this season, in order to mirror that of other GT3 and GT4 categories promoted by the Stéphane Ratel Organisation.

Entry list

GT3

GT4

Notes

Race calendar
The 2016 calendar was announced on 27 October 2015. Brands Hatch hosted the opening round after being held at Oulton Park every year since 2005, which moves to May. All races except Belgian round at Spa, were held in the United Kingdom.

Championship standings
Points system
Points are awarded as follows:

Drivers' championships

GT3

GT4

References

External links
 

British GT Championship seasons
GT Championship